Pedro David Meza (born 15 October 1985) is a former Mexican basketball player, who last played for the Capitanes de Ciudad de México and the Mineros de Zacatecas. He represented the Mexicam national team internationally, when he participated at the 2014 FIBA Basketball World Cup.

Honours
Pan American Games 2011 Silver Medal 
FIBA COCABA Championship 2013 Gold Medal 
2014 Centrobasket Gold Medal

References

External links
 RealGM profile

1985 births
Living people
Basketball players at the 2011 Pan American Games
Basketball players at the 2015 Pan American Games
Basketball players from Sinaloa
Caballeros de Culiacán players
Capitanes de Ciudad de México players
Frayles de Guasave players
Halcones de Xalapa players
Point guards
Mexican expatriate basketball people in the United States
Mexican men's basketball players
Pan American Games medalists in basketball
Pan American Games silver medalists for Mexico
Pioneros de Quintana Roo players
Sportspeople from Culiacán
2014 FIBA Basketball World Cup players
Shooting guards
Soles de Mexicali players
Trotamundos B.B.C. players
Medalists at the 2011 Pan American Games